Marvin Turtulli (born 17 October 1994) is an Albanian professional footballer who plays as a centre-back for Skënderbeu Korçë in the Albanian Superliga.

Club career

Early career
Turtulli started his youth career at FK Dinamo Tirana academies in 2011 and was placed immediately in the under-19 team. In the 2011–12 U-19 championship he played 18 matches mostly as a starter. He retained his place at under-19 side in the next season 2012–13 and in March 2013 he became part of the first team in the 2012–13 Albanian First Division.

Turtulli enjoyed a prolific form during 2013–14 season, scoring 5 times in 26 league appearances.

Teuta Durrës
Turtulli left Dinamo in June 2014 to sign with Albanian Superliga side Teuta Durrës. He made his Teuta debut on 1 October in the first leg of 2014–15 Albanian Cup first round against Besëlidhja Lezhë which finished 2–0 for Turtulli's side. He made his first Albanian Superliga appearance four days later by playing in the last 5 minutes of the 1–0 away loss to Kukësi. During the first part of season, Turtulli played only 32 minutes from 3 appearances as substitute in league before leaving the club in January 2015.

Dinamo Tirana
On 31 January 2015, Turtulli returned to his first club Dinamo on a one-year contract. He managed to play 7 league matches during the second part of 2014–15 season, as Dinamo once again avoided relegation. He continued to play as starter in the next season, making 23 league appearances, scoring no goals.

Kukësi
Turtulli joined top flight side Kukësi on 22 January 2016 for an undisclosed fee. He featured as an unused substitute in Kukësi's 2015–16 Albanian Cup quarter-final match against Teuta Durrës just one day later. He also played one match for the reserve squad on 25 January in the 2–3 loss to Vllaznia Shkodër B in the Albanian Third Division. Turtulli terminated his contract with the club unilaterally on 5 February 2016, just less than 2 weeks after joining due to limited playing time.

Tirana
On 9 July 2016, Turtulli completed a transfer to fellow capital side Tirana by penning a contract until June 2019. He spent 2016–17 season mostly on the bench, making only 13 league appearances as Tirana was relegated for the first time in history after finishing 9th. He also played 6 matches in team's successful cup campaign as Tirana won it for 16th time after defeating KF Skënderbeu Korçë 3–1 in final. It was Turtulli's first career silverware.

Turtulli started his second Tirana season in July 2017 by playing in the 2017–18 UEFA Europa League first qualifying round against Maccabi Tel Aviv. He played full-90 minutes in both legs as Tirana was eliminated 5–0 on aggregate. Later on 6 September, Turtulli played full-90 minutes as Tirana won Albanian Supercup for the 11th time after beating Kukësi 1–0 at Selman Stërmasi Stadium. Later that month, Turtulli confirmed that he will stay at Tirana to help the club return to top flight.

International career

Albania U20
Turtulli was called up at Albania national under-20 football team by coach Skënder Gega to participate in the 2013 Mediterranean Games football tournament which began on 19 June 2013 in Mersin, Turkey. He played in all 5 Albania U20s matches as a starter, 4 of them for full 90-minutes. He scored 1 goal in the Preliminary round group A matchday 2 against Bosnia and Herzegovina on 21 June to help Albania to take a 2–2 draw. Albania U20 was ranked in the last place out of 8 teams.

Style of play
Apart from his natural position as centre-back, Turtulli can also be deployed as right-back.

Career statistics

Honours

Tirana
 Albanian Cup: 2016–17
 Albanian Supercup: 2017
 Albanian First Division : Winner Group B
 Albanian First Division : 2017-2018

References

External links

1994 births
Living people
People from Lezhë
Association football central defenders
Albanian footballers
Albania youth international footballers
FK Dinamo Tirana players
KF Teuta Durrës players
FK Kukësi players
KF Tirana players
KF Skënderbeu Korçë players
Kategoria e Parë players
Kategoria Superiore players
Kategoria e Tretë players
Competitors at the 2013 Mediterranean Games
Mediterranean Games competitors for Albania